The Internet Must Go is
a 2013 independent docufiction short web film about net neutrality (the principle that Internet service providers (ISPs) should not favour either type of content over another), directed by Gena Konstantinakos.

The film chronicles the journey of (fictional) misguided market researcher John Wooley (played by Second City alum Brian Shortall) as he attempts to sell ISPs' vision for what they call a "faster, cleaner" Internet. However, learning about net neutrality from several (non-fictional) people in the process, he ultimately opts to re-consider his standpoint.

Designed specifically to reach an audience not versed in technology or policy, The Internet Must Go has reached nearly a quarter of a million viewers and about 5,000 Facebook fans in its first 2 months online.

The release of the short was made to coincide with the opening arguments in Verizon v. F.C.C. 
about Net Neutrality.

Plot
The docufiction short centers on John Wooley, a (fictional) market researcher who "has been dispatched to help the big Internet service providers sell their vision of a faster, cleaner Internet". He embarks on the journey, believing he's doing something great and important. Over the course of his journey he interviews several people (notably non-fictional people whose business depends on net neutrality), who one by one help him to understand why his mission is misguided.

Then he ventures to North Carolina where he interacts with (non-fictional) people who, stifled by a lack of broadband altogether, have attempted to build community broadband. However, he finds that North Carolina now has barriers to building community broadband. While he interacts with those people, he ultimately has a change of heart, and decides to "leak" his research publicly to the internet, in favour of net neutrality.

Production

Cast 
The movie stars Brian Shortall as (fictional) market researcher John Wooley, who interviews several people who happen to be open-internet advocates. These interviewees are, however, non-fictional people, who appear in the movie as themselves.

Fictional cast
 Brian Shortall as (fictional) market researcher John Wooley

Non-fictional cast
 Tim Wu (professor at Columbia Law School who coined net neutrality) as himself
 Al Franken (junior United States senator from Minnesota) as himself
 Rashad Robinson (executive director of Color of Change) as himself
 Alexis Ohanian (co-founder of the social news website reddit) as himself
 Eli Pariser (co-founder of Avaaz.org and Upworthy) as himself
 Farnum Brown (investment manager (at Trillium Invest Management, unnoted) and AT&T shareholder) as himself
 Gigi Sohn (of Public Knowledge) as herself
 Harold Feld (of Public Knowledge) as himself
 Robin Chase (founder and CEO of Buzzcar and former CEO of Zipcar) as herself
 Ricken Patel (executive director of Avaaz)
 Craig Aaron (President and CEO of Free Press (organization)), as himself
 Susan Crawford (professor at the Cardozo School of Law and former ICANN Board Member), as herself
 Larry Lessig (American academic best known as founding member of Creative Commons) as himself
 Catharine Rice (broadband consultant with Action Audits, North Carolina) as herself
 John Hodgman (American author, actor and humorist) as himself

Crew, Partners and Funding
The movie was fiscally sponsored by the non-for-profit Women Make Movies. Funders include The Ford Foundation, The Open Society Foundation, Media Democracy Fund, and Wyncote Foundation.

As an independent short, the film's website lists contributors to the movie, in notable detail. This includes cast/the cameos, several kinds of producers, writers, funders, editors, consultants, advisors, production managers, animators, camera, legal counsel, post-production, voiceover, assistants, pod-editors, website, graphics design, campaign, press, associates, partners and others. Links to the contributors' online identities are provided where applicable.

Soundtrack 
The movie has no stand-alone soundtrack album, but it features music from the following artists. Rebecca Gates was credited as music supervisor for the film.

 REM: Orange Crush
 Death Cab for Cutie: Amputations
 Bon Iver: Michicant
 SPOON: Don't You Evah
 OK GO: This Too Shall Pass, In the Glass, and White Knuckles
 MOBY: The Day
 Sigur Ros: Valtari
 Thao & The Get Down Stay Down: We the Common
 Laura Veirs: July Flame
 Chris Brokaw: My Idea
 Keegan Dewitt: Amtrak (National Train Day)
 Marco Trovatello: A Turn
 Podington Bear: Solar Gain
 Satan's Pilgrims: La Cazuela
 Shakey Graves: Unlucky Skin

Website
The movie was designed as a short (termed "clickable" by the director). Its website, theinternetmustgo.com, then augments its functionality. Apart from featuring the movie, it provides information about the movie such as director's notice, creators, press, etc. This information also allows a watcher to verify the docufiction nature of the movie, which is not vocalized in the work itself.

The site also features a section called "Take Action" providing activism support for net neutrality. It links to some of the non-fictional organization and people presented.

"Bonus leaks"
In a section named "Bonus leaks", the site features 13 extra videos made with the interviewees, as well as a list of real-world articles featured in the film (called "Wooley's Research"), and a map of US states "that have erected barriers to community broadband".

Aftermath

On January 6, 2014, about 4 months after the movie's release, American multinational telecommunications corporation AT&T announced that they will be pushing "sponsored data" to companies, who would be allowed to pay for the bandwidth their customers use. This arguably undermines net neutrality, as noted by several associations connected to the movie, e.g. Fight for the Future, who also supports the prediction that other carriers will most likely try to follow and details some implications on individuals and on the open internet.

In its article about the announcement, Wired noted that previously "By a 3–2 vote in 2010, the FCC adopted net neutrality rules, which became effective a year later."

See also
 Net neutrality
 Data discrimination
 Net bias
 Wireless community network
 Community informatics
 Freedom of information
 Free Culture movement
 Brian Shortall
 Women Make Movies

References

External links
 The Internet Must Go Website
 The movie on YouTube
 Director's Note about the movie
 Works by Gena Konstantinakos on her website

American docufiction films
2013 films
American independent films
Internet documentary films
2013 short documentary films
American short documentary films
2013 independent films
2010s English-language films
2010s American films